Nargiz may refer to:

 Nargeseh, also known as Nārgīz, a village in Dowreh Rural District, Chegeni District, Dowreh County, Lorestan Province, Iran
 Nargiz (opera), a 1935 opera by Muslim Magomayev 
 Nargiz Aliyeva (born 2002), Azerbaijani women's footballer